Adson Ferreira Soares (Aruanã, 6 October 2000), simply known as Adson, is a Brazilian footballer who currently plays as a midfielder for Corinthians.

Club career
Born in Aruanã, Goiás, Adson joined Corinthians' youth setup in 2017, from local side Jaraguá. On 10 December 2020, while still a youth, he renewed his contract until 2023.

Adson made his first team debut on 7 March 2021, coming on as a late substitute for Mateus Vital in a 2–1 Campeonato Paulista home win against Ponte Preta. He scored his first professional goal on 26 July, netting his team's second in a 2–1 away success over Cuiabá for the Série A championship.

Career statistics

References

External links

Corinthians profile 

2000 births
Living people
Sportspeople from Goiás
Brazilian footballers
Association football midfielders
Campeonato Brasileiro Série A players
Sport Club Corinthians Paulista players